The El Mutún mine is a large iron mine located in eastern Bolivia in the Santa Cruz Department. El Mutún represents one of the largest iron ore reserves in Bolivia and in the world having estimated reserves of 40 billion tonnes of ore grading 50% iron metal.

References 

Iron mines in Bolivia
Mines in Santa Cruz Department (Bolivia)